Board games are tabletop games that typically use . These pieces are moved or placed on a pre-marked board (playing surface) and often include elements of table, card, role-playing, and miniatures games as well.

Many board games feature a competition between two or more players. To show a few examples: in checkers (British English name 'draughts'), a player wins by capturing all opposing pieces, while Eurogames often end with a calculation of final scores. Pandemic is a cooperative game where players all win or lose as a team, and peg solitaire is a puzzle for one person.

There are many varieties of board games. Their representation of real-life situations can range from having no inherent theme, such as checkers, to having a specific theme and narrative, such as Cluedo. Rules can range from the very simple, such as in snakes and ladders; to deeply complex, as in Advanced Squad Leader.

The time required to learn or master  varies greatly from game to game, but is not necessarily related to the number or complexity of rules; for example, chess or Go possess relatively simple  but have great strategic depth.

History

Ancient
Classical board games are divided into four categories: race games (such as pachisi), space games (such as noughts and crosses), chase games (such as hnefatafl), and games of displacement (such as chess).

Board games have been played, traveled, and evolved in most cultures and societies throughout history. Several important historical sites, artifacts, and documents shed light on early board games such as Jiroft civilization game boards in Iran. Senet, found in Predynastic and First Dynasty burials of Egypt, c. 3500 BC and 3100 BC respectively, is the oldest board game known to have existed. Senet was pictured in a fresco painting found in Merknera's tomb (3300–2700 BC). Also from predynastic Egypt is mehen.

Hounds and jackals, another ancient Egyptian board game, appeared around 2000 BC. The first complete set of this game was discovered from a Theban tomb that dates to the 13th dynasty. This game was also popular in Mesopotamia and the Caucasus.

Backgammon originated in ancient Mesopotamia about 5,000 years ago.  ashtapada, chess, pachisi and chaupar originated in India. Go and liubo originated in China. Patolli originated in Mesoamerica played by the ancient Aztecs and the royal game of Ur was found in the royal tombs of Ur, dating to Mesopotamia 4,600 years ago.

European

Board games have a long tradition in Europe. The oldest records of board gaming in Europe date back to Homer's Iliad (written in the 8th century BC), in which he mentions the Ancient Greek game of petteia. This game of petteia would later evolve into the Roman ludus latrunculorum. Board gaming in ancient Europe was not unique to the Greco-Roman world, with records estimating that the ancient Norse game of hnefatafl was developed sometime before 400AD. In ancient Ireland, the game of fidchell or ficheall, is said to date back to at least 144 AD, though this is likely an anachronism. A fidchell board dating from the 10th century has been uncovered in Co. Westmeath, Ireland.

The association of dice and cards with gambling led to all dice games except backgammon being treated as lotteries by dice in the gaming acts of 1710 and 1845. Early board game producers in the second half of the eighteenth century were mapmakers. The global popularization of Board Games, with special themes and branding, coincided with the formation of the global dominance of the British Empire. John Wallis was an English board game publisher, bookseller, map/chart seller, printseller, music seller, and cartographer. With his sons John Wallis Jr. and Edward Wallis, he was one of the most prolific publishers of board games of the late 18th and early 19th centuries. John Betts' A Tour of the British Colonies and Foreign Possessions and William Spooner's A Voyage of Discovery were popular in the British empire.  is a genre of wargaming developed in 19th century Prussia to teach battle tactics to officers.

American
In 17th- and 18th-century colonial America, the agrarian life of the country left little time for game playing, although draughts (checkers), bowling, and card games were not unknown. The Pilgrims and Puritans of New England frowned on game-playing, and they often viewed dice as instruments of the devil. When Governor William Bradford discovered a group of non-Puritans playing stool ball, pitching the bar, and pursuing other sports in the streets on Christmas Day, 1622, he confiscated their implements, reprimanded them, and told them their devotion for the day should be confined to their homes.

In Thoughts on Lotteries (1826), Thomas Jefferson wrote: Almost all these pursuits of chance [i.e., of human industry] produce something useful to society. But there are some which produce nothing, and endanger the well-being of the individuals engaged in them or of others depending on them. Such are games with cards, dice, billiards, etc. And although the pursuit of them is a matter of natural right, yet society, perceiving the irresistible bent of some of its members to pursue them, and the ruin produced by them to the families depending on these individuals, consider it as a case of insanity, quoad hoc, step in to protect the family and the party himself, as in other cases of insanity, infancy, imbecility, etc., and suppress the pursuit altogether, and the natural right of following it. There are some other games of chance, useful on certain occasions, and injurious only when carried beyond their useful bounds. Such are insurances, lotteries, raffles, etc. These they do not suppress, but take their regulation under their own discretion.

The board game Traveller's Tour Through the United States and its sister game Traveller's Tour Through Europe were published by New York City bookseller F. & R. Lockwood in 1822 and claim the distinction of being the first board games published in the United States.

As the U.S. shifted from agrarian to urban living in the 19th century, greater leisure time and a rise in income became available to the middle class. The American home, once the center of economic production, became the locus of entertainment, enlightenment, and education under mothers' supervision. Children were encouraged to play board games that developed literacy skills and provided moral instruction.

The earliest board games published in the United States were based on Christian morality. The Mansion of Happiness (1843), for example, sent players along a path of virtues and vices that led to the Mansion of Happiness (Heaven). The Game of Pope and Pagan, or The Siege of the Stronghold of Satan by the Christian Army (1844) pitted an image on its board of a Hindu woman committing suttee against missionaries landing on a foreign shore. The missionaries are cast in white as "the symbol of innocence, temperance, and hope" while the pope and pagan are cast in black, the color of "gloom of error, and ... grief at the daily loss of empire".

Commercially produced board games in the mid-19th century were monochrome prints laboriously hand-colored by teams of low-paid young factory women. Advances in papermaking and printmaking during the period enabled the commercial production of relatively inexpensive board games. The most significant advance was the development of chromolithography, a technological achievement that made bold, richly colored images available at affordable prices. Games cost as little as US$.25 for a small-boxed card game to $3.00 for more elaborate games.

American Protestants believed a virtuous life led to success, but the belief was challenged mid-century when the country embraced materialism and capitalism. In 1860, The Checkered Game of Life rewarded players for mundane activities such as attending college, marrying and getting rich. Daily life rather than eternal life became the focus of board games. The game was the first to focus on secular virtues rather than religious virtues; it sold 40,000 copies in its first year.

Game of the District Messenger Boy, or Merit Rewarded, published in 1886 by the New York City firm of McLoughlin Brothers, was one of the first board games based on materialism and capitalism published in the United States. The game is a typical roll-and-move track board game. Players move their tokens along the track at the spin of the arrow toward the goal at the track's end. Some spaces on the track will advance the player while others will send him back.

In the affluent 1880s, Americans witnessed the publication of Algeresque rags to riches games that permitted players to emulate the capitalist heroes of the age. One of the first such games, The Game of the District Messenger Boy, encouraged the idea that the lowliest messenger boy could ascend the corporate ladder to its topmost rung. Such games insinuated that the accumulation of wealth brought increased social status. Competitive capitalistic games culminated in 1935 with Monopoly, the most commercially successful board game in U.S. history.

McLoughlin Brothers published similar games based on the telegraph boy theme including Game of the Telegraph Boy, or Merit Rewarded (1888). Greg Downey notes in his essay, "Information Networks and Urban Spaces: The Case of the Telegraph Messenger Boy", that families who could afford the deluxe version of the game in its chromolithographed, the wood-sided box would not "have sent their sons out for such a rough apprenticeship in the working world."

Margaret Hofer described the period of the 1880s–1920s as "The Golden Age" of board gaming in America. Board game popularity was boosted, like that of many items, through mass production, which made them cheaper and more easily available. Although there are no detailed statistics, some scholars suggest that the 20th century saw a decline in the popularity of the hobby.

Chinese, Arabic, and Indian
Outside of Europe and the U.S., many traditional board games are popular. In China, Go and many variations of chess are popular. In Africa and the Middle East, mancala is a popular board game archetype with many regional variations. In India, a community game called Carrom is popular.

Modern

The late 1990s onwards have seen substantial growth in the reach and market of board games. This has been attributed to, among other factors, the Internet, which has made it easier for people to find out about games and to find opponents to play against, as well as with a general increase in leisure time and consumer spending on entertainment. Around the year 2000, the board gaming industry began significant growth, with companies producing a rising number of new games to be sold to a growing worldwide audience. In the 2010s, several publications referred to board games as having a new Golden Age, though some board-gamers prefer to call it a 'renaissance', as The Golden Age is both predefined and a common term. Board game venues are also growing in popularity; in 2016, over 5,000 board game cafés opened in the U.S. alone. Board game cafés are also reported to be very popular in China. Board games have also been used as a mechanism for science communication.

Luck, strategy, and diplomacy
Some games, such as chess, depend completely on player skill, while many children's games such as Candy Land and snakes and ladders require no decisions by the players and are decided purely by luck.

Many games require some level of both skill and luck. A player may be hampered by bad luck in backgammon, Monopoly, or Risk; but over many games, a skilled player will win more often. The elements of luck can also make for more excitement at times, and allow for more diverse and multifaceted strategies, as concepts such as expected value and risk management must be considered.

Luck may be introduced into a game by several methods. The use of dice of various sorts goes back to the earliest board games. These can decide everything from how many steps a player moves their token, as in Monopoly, to how their forces fare in battle, as in Risk, or which resources a player gains, as in Catan. Other games such as Sorry! use a deck of special cards that, when shuffled, create randomness. Scrabble does something similar with randomly picked letters. Other games use spinners, timers of random length, or other sources of randomness. German-style board games are notable for often having fewer elements of luck than many North American board games.

Another important aspect of some games is diplomacy, that is, players, making deals with one another. Negotiation generally features only in games with three or more players, cooperative games being the exception. An important facet of Catan, for example, is convincing players to trade with you rather than with opponents. In Risk, two or more players may team up against others. Easy diplomacy involves convincing other players that someone else is winning and should therefore be teamed up against. Advanced diplomacy (e.g., in the aptly named game Diplomacy) consists of making elaborate plans together, with the possibility of betrayal.

In perfect information games, such as chess, each player has complete information on the state of the game, but in other games, such as Tigris and Euphrates or Stratego, some information is hidden from players. This makes finding the best move more difficult and may involve estimating probabilities by the opponents.

Software

Many board games are now available as video games. These are aptly termed digital board games, and their distinguishing characteristic compared to traditional board games is they can now be played online against a computer or other players. Some websites (such as boardgamearena.com, yucata.de, etc.) allow play in real time and immediately show the opponents' moves, while others use email to notify the players after each move. The Internet and cheaper home printing has also influenced board games via print-and-play games that may be purchased and printed. Some games use external media such as audio cassettes or DVDs in accompaniment to the game.

There are also virtual tabletop programs that allow online players to play a variety of existing and new board games through tools needed to manipulate the game board but do not necessarily enforce the game's rules, leaving this up to the players. There are generalized programs such as Vassal, Tabletop Simulator and Tabletopia that can be used to play any board or card game, while programs like Roll20 and Fantasy Grounds that are more specialized for role-playing games. Some of these virtual tabletops have worked with the license holders to allow for use of their game's assets within the program; for example, Fantasy Grounds has licenses for both Dungeons & Dragons and Pathfinder materials, while Tabletop Simulator allows game publishers to provide paid downloadable content for their games. However, as these games offer the ability to add in the content through user modifications, there are also unlicensed uses of board game assets available through these programs.

Market

While the board gaming market is estimated to be smaller than that for video games, it has also experienced significant growth from the late 1990s. A 2012 article in The Guardian described board games as "making a comeback". Other expert sources suggest that board games never went away, and that board games have remained a popular leisure activity which has only grown over time.  Another from 2014 gave an estimate that put the growth of the board game market at "between 25% and 40% annually" since 2010, and described the current time as the "golden era for board games". The rise in board game popularity has been attributed to quality improvement (more elegant mechanics, artwork, and graphics) as well as increased availability thanks to sales through the Internet. Crowd-sourcing for board games is a large facet of the market, with $233 million raised on Kickstarter in 2020.

A 1991 estimate for the global board game market was over $1.2 billion. A 2001 estimate for the United States "board games and puzzle" market gave a value of under $400 million, and for United Kingdom, of about £50 million. A 2009 estimate for the Korean market was put at 800 million won, and another estimate for the American board game market for the same year was at about $800 million. A 2011 estimate for the Chinese board game market was at over 10 billion yuan. (Some estimates may split board games from collectible card, miniature and role-playing games; for example another 2014 estimate distinguishing board games from other types of hobby games gave the estimate for the U.S. and Canada market at only $75 million, with the total size of what it defined as the hobby game market at over $700 million, with a 2015 estimate suggesting a value of almost $900 million) A 2013 estimate put the size of the German toy market at 2.7 billion euros (out of which, the board games and puzzle market is worth about 375 million euros), and Polish markets, at 2 billion and 280 million zlotys, respectively. Per capita, in 2009 Germany was considered to be the best market, with the highest number of games sold per individual.

Research

A dedicated field of research into gaming exists, known as game studies or ludology.

While there has been a fair amount of scientific research on the psychology of older board games (e.g., chess, Go, mancala), less has been done on contemporary board games such as Monopoly, Scrabble, and Risk, and especially modern board games such as Catan, Agricola, and Pandemic. Much research has been carried out on chess, partly because many tournament players are publicly ranked in national and international lists, which makes it possible to compare their levels of expertise. The works of Adriaan de Groot, William Chase, Herbert A. Simon, and Fernand Gobet have established that knowledge, more than the ability to anticipate moves, plays an essential role in chess-playing ability.

Linearly arranged board games have improved children's spatial numerical understanding. This is because the game is similar to a number line in that they promote a linear understanding of numbers rather than the innate logarithmic one.

Research studies show that board games such as Snakes and Ladders result in children showing significant improvements in aspects of basic number skills such as counting, recognizing numbers, numerical estimation, and number comprehension. They also practice fine motor skills each time they grasp a game piece. Playing board games has also been tied to improving children's executive functions and help reduce risks of dementia for the elderly. Related to this is a growing academic interest in the topic of game accessibility, culminating in the development of guidelines for assessing the accessibility of modern tabletop games and the extent to which they are playable for people with disabilities.

Additionally, board games can be therapeutic. Bruce Halpenny, a games inventor said when interviewed about his game, The Great Train Robbery:With crime you deal with every basic human emotion and also have enough elements to combine action with melodrama. The player's imagination is fired as they plan to rob the train. Because of the gamble, they take in the early stage of the game there is a build-up of tension, which is immediately released once the train is robbed. Release of tension is therapeutic and useful in our society because most jobs are boring and repetitive.

Playing games has been suggested as a viable addition to the traditional educational curriculum if the content is appropriate and the gameplay informs students on the curriculum content.

Categories
There are several ways in which board games can be classified, and considerable overlap may exist, so that a game belongs to several categories.

H. J. R. Murray's A History of Board Games Other Than Chess (1952) has been called the first attempt to develop a "scheme for the classification of board games". David Parlett's Oxford History of Board Games (1999) defines four primary categories: race games (where the goal is to be the first to move all one's pieces to the final destination), space games (in which the object is to arrange the pieces into some special configuration), chase games (asymmetrical games, where players start the game with different sets of pieces and objectives) and displace games (where the main objective is the capture the opponents' pieces). Parlett also distinguishes between abstract and thematic games, the latter having a specific theme or frame narrative (ex. regular chess versus, for example, Star Wars-themed chess).

The following is a list of some of the most common game categories:

 Abstract strategy games – e.g. chess, checkers, Go, reversi, tafl games, or modern games such as Abalone, Dameo, Stratego, Hive, or GIPF
 Alignment games – e.g. renju, gomoku, Connect6, Nine men's morris, or tic-tac-toe
 Auction games – e.g. Hoity Toity, Power Grid
 Chess variants – traditional variants e.g. shogi, xiangqi, or janggi; modern variants e.g. Chess960, Grand Chess, Hexagonal chess, or Alice Chess
 Configuration games – e.g. Lines of Action, Hexade, or Entropy
 Connection games – e.g. TwixT, Hex, or Havannah
 Cooperative games – e.g. Max the Cat, Caves and Claws, or Pandemic
 Count and capture games – e.g. mancala games
 Cross and circle games – e.g. Yut, Ludo, or Aggravation
 Deduction games – e.g. Mastermind or Black Box
 Dexterity games – e.g. Tumblin' Dice or Pitch Car
 Economic simulation games – e.g. The Business Game, Monopoly, The Game of Life, Power Grid, or Food Chain Magnate
 Educational games – e.g. Arthur Saves the Planet, Cleopatra and the Society of Architects, or Shakespeare: The Bard Game
 Elimination games – e.g. draughts, Alquerque, Fanorona, Yoté, or Surakarta
 Family games – e.g. Roll Through the Ages, Birds on a Wire, or For Sale
 Fantasy games – e.g. Shadows Over Camelot
 German-style board games or Eurogames – e.g. Catan, Carcassonne, Decatur • The Game, Carson City, or Puerto Rico
 Guessing games – e.g. Pictionary or Battleship
 Hidden-movement games – e.g. Clue or Escape from the Aliens in Outer Space
 Hidden-role games – e.g. Mafia or The Resistance
 Historical simulation games – e.g. Through the Ages or Railways of the World
 Horror games – e.g. Arkham Horror
 Large multiplayer games – e.g. Take It Easy or Swat (2010)
 Learning/communication non-competitive games – e.g. The Ungame (1972)
 Mancala games – e.g. Wari, Oware, or The Glass Bead Game
 Multiplayer games – e.g. Risk, Monopoly, or Four-player chess
 Musical games – e.g. Spontuneous
 Negotiation games – e.g. Diplomacy
 Paper-and-pencil games – e.g. Tic-tac-toe or Dots and Boxes
 Physical skill games – e.g. Camp Granada
 Position games (no captures; win by leaving the opponent unable to move) – e.g. kōnane, mū tōrere, or the L game
 Race games – e.g. Pachisi, backgammon, snakes and ladders, hyena chase, or Worm Up
 Role-playing games – e.g. Dungeons & Dragons
 Roll-and-move games – e.g. Monopoly or Life
 Running-fight games – e.g. bul
 Share-buying games (games in which players buy stakes in each other's positions) – typically longer economic-management games, e.g. Acquire or Panamax
 Single-player puzzle games – e.g. peg solitaire or Sudoku
 Spiritual development games (games with no winners or losers) – e.g. Transformation Game or Psyche's Key
 Stacking games – e.g. Lasca or DVONN
  Storytelling games – e.g. Dixit or Tales of the Arabian Nights
 Territory games – e.g. Go or Reversi
 Tile-based games – e.g. Carcassonne, Scrabble, Tigris and Euphrates, or Evo
 Train games – e.g. Ticket to Ride, Steam, or 18xx
 Trivia games – e.g. Trivial Pursuit
 Two-player-only themed games – e.g. En Garde or Dos de Mayo
 Unequal forces (or "hunt") games – e.g. fox and geese or tablut
 Wargames – ranging from Risk, Diplomacy, or Axis & Allies, to Attack! or Conquest of the Empire
 Word games – e.g. Scrabble, Boggle, Anagrams, or What's My Word? (2010)

Glossary 

Although many board games have a jargon all their own, there is a generalized terminology to describe concepts applicable to basic game mechanics and attributes common to nearly all board games.

See also 

 Board game awards
 BoardGameGeek—a website for board game enthusiasts
 Going Cardboard—a documentary movie
 History of games
 Interactive movie—DVD games
 List of board games
 List of game manufacturers
 Mind sport

References

Further reading

 Austin, Roland G. "Greek Board Games." Antiquity 14. September 1940: 257–271
 
 
 
 
 Fiske, Willard. Chess in Iceland and in Icelandic Literature—with historical notes on other table-games. Florentine Typographical Society, 1905.
 
 Golladay, Sonja Musser,  "Los Libros de Acedrex Dados E Tablas: Historical, Artistic and Metaphysical Dimensions of Alfonso X's Book of Games" (PhD diss., University of Arizona, 2007)
 
 
 
 
 
 
 
 
 
 Rollefson, Gary O., "A Neolithic Game Board from Ain Ghazal, Jordan", Bulletin of the American Schools of Oriental Research, No. 286. (May 1992), pp. 1–5.

External links

 
 BoardGameGeek
 BoardGameTheories
 International Board Game Studies Association

 
 
Egyptian inventions